Lamel Hill is a scheduled monument about  south-east of the centre of York, England. It is near The Retreat and the northern part of Walmgate Stray, and in some medieval documents it is referred to as Siward's Mill Hill, or Siward's How Mill, in reference to its previous use as the base of a windmill. However it should not be confused with another site known as Siward's Howe which is about  further east.

Lamel Hill is best known for having been the location of a Parliamentary gun-emplacement aimed at Walmgate Bar in the City Walls during the Siege of York in 1644.  It was the site of York's first formal archaeological excavation in 1849, when traces of an Anglo-Saxon cemetery were found. Lamel Hill is part of a conservation area which was designated in 1975.

References

External links

Parks and commons in York